Eilema inducta is a moth of the subfamily Arctiinae first described by Francis Walker in 1865. It is found in the Nilgiri Mountains of India.

References

inducta